Robert S. Sargent (1912–2006) was an electrical engineer, Defense Department defensive weapons specialist, and published poet who lived most of his adult life in Washington, DC.

Early life, education and military service 
Sargent was born in New Orleans in 1912, raised in Mississippi, and was a 1933 graduate of Mississippi State University. He also did graduate work at Bowdoin College in Maine, where he worked on the early development of radar, and the Massachusetts Institute of Technology. After serving in the Navy during World War II, he worked at the Pentagon from the late 1940s until 1972. During his time at the Pentagon he was the recipient of the Distinguished Civilian Service Award.

Literary career 
Sargent began writing poetry in his fifties and published 11 books of poetry. Sargent's literary subjects included his family, the American South, art, love, the Bible, and jazz. His poems were published in a number of literary journals, including Antioch Review, New York Quarterly, Georgia Review, Poetry Review, Prairie Schooner, Western Humanities Review and many others. His poems also appeared in a number of anthologies, including Poetry magazine's The Poetry Anthology. He was actively involved in several DC literary organizations, including Washington Writers Publishing House, Word Works, the Folger Poetry Advisory Committee, and the Capitol Hill Poetry Group. He received the Poetry Committee's Columbia Merit Award in 1996.

Publications 
 1977 – Now is Always the Miraculous Time
 1979 – A Woman from Memphis
 1983 – Aspects of a Southern Story
 1989 – Fish Galore
 1994 – The Cartographer
 1998 – Stealthy Days
 2000 – The Jazz Poems of Robert Sargent
 2001 – Altered in the Telling
 2002 – Wonderous News
 2003 – 99 After 80
 2004 – Lula and I

References

External links 
Preliminary Guide to the Robert Sargent Literary Papers, 1923–2006, Special Collections Research Center, Estelle and Melvin Gelman Library, The George Washington University
Sanders, Lee and Sargent families papers, Special Collections Department, Mississippi State University Libraries
Robert Sargent: Remembering a Friend and Poet
DC Writers' Homes: Robert Sargent

American male poets
American electrical engineers
Mississippi State University alumni
1912 births
2006 deaths
United States Department of Defense officials
20th-century American poets
20th-century American male writers
20th-century American engineers